Delessite is a mineral variety, a magnesium-rich form of chamosite which is a member of the chlorite group. Delessite has the chemical formula .

References
Mindat with location data

Phyllosilicates